Chaetocalathus is a genus of fungus in the mushroom family Marasmiaceae.

See also

List of Marasmiaceae genera

External links

Marasmiaceae
Agaricales genera
Taxa named by Rolf Singer